Culworth is a village and civil parish about  north of Brackley in West Northamptonshire, England.

The 2011 Census recorded the parish's population as 445.

History

Toponymy 
The villages name means 'Cula's enclosure'.

Roman coin 
A third-century Roman coin from the brief reign of the Roman emperor Quintillus was found in the parish before 1841.

Manor 
Berry Hill, just north of the parish church, is a medieval ringwork, built probably late in the 11th century. It is a scheduled monument. On its southwest side, part of its circular ditch was cut away in the 19th century to make the garden of the Old Rectory, but otherwise it survives intact. There are similar ringworks at Sulgrave, Weedon Lois and Weston.

William de Culworth was sheriff of Hertfordshire and Constable of Hertford Castle in 1230 and 1234.

The D'Anvers family held the manor of Culworth by 1643, when Samuel D'Anvers (1611–1683) was created a baronet. The D'Anvers Baronetcy became extinct with the death of Sir Michael D'Anvers, 5th Baronet, in 1776.

The Old Manor is a 17th-century courtyard house, enlarged in the 18th century. Sir John D'Anvers, 3rd Baronet (1673–1744) had a large mansion built, but it has not survived. There is a newer Danvers House that is reputed to include materials from the mansion, and certainly includes window frames that may date from about 1700.

Church and chapel 

The Church of England parish church of Saint Mary the Virgin has north and south aisles with three-bay Norman arcades dating from about 1200. Late in the 13th century the arcades were lengthened and the lower part of the west tower was built. The upper part of the tower is Perpendicular Gothic and therefore was built later. The chancel was rebuilt in 1840 and the building was altered and refitted in 1880 to designs by the architect E.F. Law of Northampton. The church is a Grade II* listed building.

By 1254 the Augustinian Canons Ashby Priory held "the spiritualities" of St. Mary's parish. Early in the 14th century there was a dispute between Roger de Mussynden and Prior Adam of the Priory for possession of the advowson, which was settled in 1325 in favour of the Priory.

A marble monument inside the church to the D'Anvers baronets was erected in 1790. Graves in the churchyard include that of Charles Bacchus, an African servant who died in 1762 at the age of 16.

The tower has a ring of five bells. One of the Newcombe family of bell-founders of Leicester cast the oldest bell in 1612. Henry I Bagley of Chacombe cast the tenor bell in 1636. Other bells were cast by Edward Hemins of Bicester in 1741 and John Briant of Hertford in 1806. John Taylor & Co of Loughborough cast the treble bell in 1931. St. Mary's has also a sanctus bell that was cast by an unidentified founder in about 1700.

St Mary's parish is a member of the Benefice of Culworth with Sulgrave and Thorpe Mandeville and Chipping Warden with Edgcote and Moreton Pinkney.

The Rectory is a Gothic Revival house built in 1854. It was enlarged and altered in 1869 to designs by E.F. Law.

East of Danvers House is a Moravian Chapel that was built in 1810.

Social and economic history 

The parish's common fields were enclosed by agreement in 1612. Most of the ridge and furrow pattern of the common fields is still visible.

The village has shrunk, leaving earthworks at its northwest and southeast ends marking the sites of former houses. It was a mill pond, but the watermill has been lost.

After the extinction of the Danvers baronetcy Meriel Danvers, a spinster of the family, endowed Danvers Free School in 1789 and it was built in about 1795. It is now Culworth Church of England Primary School.

Westhill House is 17th-century with 18th-century additions, and has a 17th-century barn and granary.

In 1899 a station was opened in Moreton Pinkney parish,  from Culworth and only  from Moreton Pinkney village. However, there was already a Morton Pinkney railway station so the Great Central Railway called the new station .

It passed through Culworth parish just west of the village and in 1913 the Great Central opened a halt for the village. As the company already had a Culworth railway station it called the new halt .

British Railways closed the halt in 1956 and Culworth station in 1958. The 1963 The Reshaping of British Railways report recommended that BR close the line through Eydon Road, which it did in 1966.

Amenities
Culworth has one public house, the Red Lion.

References

Sources

External links

Culworth Village

Civil parishes in Northamptonshire
Villages in Northamptonshire
West Northamptonshire District